Christian M. Dahl (August 21, 1856 – August 4, 1923) was a North Dakota Republican Party politician who served as the 2nd Secretary of State of North Dakota from 1893 to 1896.

Christian M. Dahl was an immigrant from Norway. He first won election to the Secretary of State position in 1892, and served until 1896 when he did not seek re-election. He was married to Helen Hanchett, the daughter of George Edwin Hanchett  and Elizabeth (Oakley) Hanchett.
He died  at the age of 67 and was buried at  Fairview Cemetery in Bismarck, North Dakota.

Notes

1856 births
1923 deaths
Secretaries of State of North Dakota
North Dakota Republicans
Norwegian emigrants to the United States